The 1884 United States House of Representatives elections were held for the most part on November 4, 1884, with four states holding theirs early between June and October. They coincided with the election of President Grover Cleveland. Elections were held for 325 seats of the United States House of Representatives, representing 38 states, to serve in the 49th United States Congress. Special elections were also held throughout the year.

In spite of Cleveland's victory, the opposition Republican Party gained back some of the seats lost in 1882, but the Democratic Party retained a majority in the House.  Republicans were able to make these slight gains by connecting their pro-business and industry message with progress.  The Democrats were also hindered by the Panic of 1884, but were not greatly affected by it since the depression ended quickly.

Election summaries

Early election dates

In 1884, four states, with 28 seats among them, held elections early:

June 2 Oregon
September 2 Vermont
September 13 Maine
October 14 Ohio

Special elections

Alabama

Arkansas

California 

Two new districts were created for the seats gained in the 1882 reapportionment, eliminating the  that had been created for them.

Colorado

Connecticut

Delaware

Florida

Georgia

Illinois

Indiana

Iowa

Kansas

Kentucky

Louisiana

Maine

Maryland

Massachusetts 

|-
! 
| Robert T. Davis
|  | Republican
| 1882
| Incumbent re-elected.
| nowrap | 

|-
! 
| John Davis Long
|  | Republican
| 1882
| Incumbent re-elected.
| nowrap | 

|-
! 
| Ambrose A. Ranney
|  | Republican
| 1880
| Incumbent re-elected.
| nowrap | 

|-
! 
| Patrick A. Collins
|  | Democratic
| 1882
| Incumbent re-elected.
| nowrap | 

|-
! 
| Leopold Morse
|  | Democratic
| 1876
|  | Incumbent retired.New member elected.Republican gain.
| nowrap | 

|-
! 
| Henry B. Lovering
|  | Democratic
| 1882
| Incumbent re-elected.
| nowrap | 

|-
! 
| Eben F. Stone
|  | Republican
| 1880
| Incumbent re-elected.
| nowrap | 

|-
! 
| William A. Russell
|  | Republican
| 1878
|  | Incumbent retired.New member elected.Republican hold.
| nowrap | 

|-
! 
| Theodore Lyman III
|  | Independent Republican
| 1882
|  | Incumbent lost re-election.New member elected.Republican gain.
| nowrap | 
|-
! 
| William W. Rice
|  | Republican
| 1876
| Incumbent re-elected.
| nowrap | 
|-
! 
| William Whiting II
|  | Republican
| 1882
| Incumbent re-elected.
| nowrap | 
|-
! 
| Francis W. Rockwell
|  | Republican
| Jan. 1884 (special)
| Incumbent re-elected.
| nowrap | 
|}

Michigan

Minnesota

Mississippi 

|-
! 
| Henry L. Muldrow
|  | Democratic
| 1876
|  | Incumbent retired to become First Assistant Secretary of the Interior.New member elected.Democratic hold.
| nowrap | 

|-
! 
| James R. Chalmers
|  | Independent
| 1882
|  | Incumbent lost re-election as a Republican.New member elected.Democratic gain.
| nowrap | 

|-
! 
| Elza Jeffords
|  | Republican
| 1882
|  | Incumbent retired.New member elected.Democratic gain.
| nowrap | 

|-
! 
| Hernando Money
|  | Democratic
| 1874
|  | Incumbent retired.New member elected.Democratic hold.
| nowrap | 

|-
! 
| Otho R. Singleton
|  | Democratic
| 1874
| Incumbent re-elected.
| nowrap | 

|-
! 
| Henry S. Van Eaton
|  | Democratic
| 1882
| Incumbent re-elected.
| nowrap | 

|-
! 
| Ethelbert Barksdale
|  | Democratic
| 1882
| Incumbent re-elected.
| nowrap | 

|}

Missouri

Nebraska 

|-
! 
| Archibald J. Weaver
|  | Republican 
| 1882
| Incumbent re-elected.
| nowrap | 

|-
! 
| James Laird
|  | Republican 
| 1882
| Incumbent re-elected.
| nowrap | 

|-
! 
| Edward K. Valentine
|  | Republican 
| 1878
|  | Incumbent retired.New member elected.Republican hold.
| nowrap | 

|}

Nevada

New Hampshire

New Jersey

New York

North Carolina

Ohio

Oregon

Pennsylvania

Rhode Island

South Carolina

Tennessee 

|-
! 
| Augustus H. Pettibone
|  | Republican
| 1880
| Incumbent re-elected.
| nowrap | 

|-
! 
| Leonidas C. Houk
|  | Republican
| 1878
| Incumbent re-elected.
| nowrap | 

|-
! 
| George G. Dibrell
|  | Democratic
| 1874
|  |Incumbent retired.New member elected.Democratic hold.
| nowrap | 

|-
! 
| Benton McMillin
|  | Democratic
| 1878
| Incumbent re-elected.
|  nowrap | 

|-
! 
| Richard Warner
|  | Democratic
| 1880
|  |Incumbent lost renomination.New member elected.Democratic hold.
| nowrap | 

|-
! 
| Andrew J. Caldwell
|  | Democratic
| 1882
| Incumbent re-elected.
| nowrap | 

|-
! 
| John G. Ballentine
|  | Democratic
| 1882
| Incumbent re-elected.
| nowrap | 

|-
! 
| John M. Taylor
|  | Democratic
| 1882
| Incumbent re-elected.
| nowrap | 

|-
! 
| Rice A. Pierce
|  | Democratic
| 1882
|  |Incumbent lost renomination.New member elected.Democratic hold.
| nowrap | 

|-
! 
| H. Casey Young
|  | Democratic
| 1882
|  |Incumbent retired.New member elected.Republican gain.
| 

|}

Texas

Vermont

Virginia

West Virginia 

|-
! 
| Nathan Goff Jr.
|  | Republican
| 1882
| Incumbent re-elected.
| nowrap | 

|-
! 
| William L. Wilson
|  | Democratic
| 1882
| Incumbent re-elected.
| nowrap | 

|-
! 
| Charles P. Snyder
|  | Democratic
| 1883 (special)
| Incumbent re-elected.
| nowrap | 

|-
! 
| Eustace Gibson
|  | Democratic
| 1882
| Incumbent re-elected.
| nowrap | 

|}

Wisconsin 

Wisconsin elected nine members of congress on Election Day, November 4, 1884.

|-
! 
| John Winans
|  | Democratic
| 1882
|  | Incumbent retired.New member elected.Republican gain.
| nowrap | 

|-
! 
| Daniel H. Sumner
|  | Democratic
| 1882
|  | Incumbent lost re-nomination.New member elected.Democratic hold.
| nowrap | 

|-
! 
| Burr W. Jones
|  | Democratic
| 1882
| |  Incumbent lost re-election.New member elected.Republican gain.
| nowrap | 

|-
! 
| Peter V. Deuster
|  | Democratic
| 1878
| |  Incumbent lost re-election.New member elected.Republican gain.
| nowrap | 

|-
! 
| Joseph Rankin
|  | Democratic
| 1882
| Incumbent re-elected.
| nowrap | 

|-
! 
| Richard W. Guenther
|  | Republican
| 1880
| Incumbent re-elected.
| nowrap | 

|-
! 
| Gilbert M. Woodward
|  | Democratic
| 1882
| |  Incumbent lost re-election.New member elected.Republican gain.
| nowrap | 

|-
! 
| William T. Price
|  | Republican
| 1882
| Incumbent re-elected.
| nowrap | 

|-
! 
| Isaac Stephenson
|  | Republican
| 1882
| Incumbent re-elected.
| nowrap | 

|}

Non-voting delegates

Idaho Territory

Montana Territory

Wyoming Territory

See also
 1884 United States elections
 1884 United States presidential election
 1884–85 United States Senate elections
 48th United States Congress
 49th United States Congress

Notes

References

Bibliography

External links 
 Office of the Historian (Office of Art & Archives, Office of the Clerk, U.S. House of Representatives)